The Intergovernmental Panel on Climate Change (IPCC) with the United Nations Framework Convention on Climate Change (UNFCCC) use tens of acronyms and initialisms in documents relating to climate change policy.

A 
 AAU - Assigned amount unit
 AGGI - Annual Greenhouse Gas Index
 AMO - Atlantic multidecadal oscillation
 AO - Arctic oscillation

C 
 CDM – Clean Development Mechanism is an arrangement under the Kyoto Protocol allowing industrialised countries with a greenhouse gas reduction commitment (called Annex 1 countries) to invest in projects that reduce emissions in developing countries as an alternative to more expensive emission reductions in their own countries.
 CDR - Carbon dioxide removal
 CER – Certified Emission Reduction
 CFC - Chlorofluorocarbon
 CF4 - Carbon tetrafluoride
 CH4 - Methane
 COP - Conference of the Parties
 CO2 - Carbon dioxide
 C2F6 - Hexafluoroethane

D 
 DER – Distributed Energy Resources is a small-scale unit of power generation that operates locally and is connected to a larger power grid at the distribution level. DERs include solar panels, small natural gas-fueled generators, electric vehicles and controllable loads, such as HVAC systems and electric water heaters. An important distinction of a DER is that the energy it produces is often consumed close to the source.

E 
 EEI - Earth's Energy Imbalance
 ENSO - El Niño–Southern Oscillation

G 
 GCM - General circulation model or global climate model
 GFDL - Geophysical Fluid Dynamics Laboratory
 GHG - Greenhouse gas
 GWP - Global warming potential

H 
 HCFC - Hydrochlorofluorocarbon
 HFC - Hydrofluorocarbon
 H2O - Water vapor

I 
 IOD - Indian Ocean Dipole
 IPO - Interdecadal Pacific oscillation

M 
 MSL - Mean Sea Level

N 
 NAPA – National Adaptation Programme of Action.
 NCAR - National Center for Atmospheric Research
 NF3 - Nitrogen trifluoride
 N20 - Nitrous oxide

O 
 OHC - Ocean heat content
 O3 - (Tropospheric) Ozone

P 
 PDO - Pacific decadal oscillation

R 
 REDD – Reducing emissions from deforestation and forest degradation mechanisms use market/financial incentives to reduce the emission of greenhouse gases from deforestation and forest degradation.

S 
 SSP - Shared Socioeconomic Pathways
 SST - Sea surface temperature
 SF6 - Sulfur hexafluoride

T 
 TEWI - Total equivalent warming impact

U 
 UHI - Urban heat island

W 
 WMO - World Meteorological Organization

See also
 Glossary of climate change

References

Climate change